Haji Shahla Mosque is a historical mosque of the fourteenth century. It is located in Balakhany village in the city of Baku in Azerbaijan.

History
The mosque was built at area of Balakhany Cemetery, on a high hill in 1385–1386. Over time, the monument was destroyed. However, in 2017, restoration works were started to be held on the mosque.

There were two lines of inscription on the entrance door. That text is as follows:"This is the mansion of Haji Shahla bin Shakir bin Mustafa Koshki. Year 787 (1385-1386)" 

A little left from this inscription, there was also another inscription in Arabic slightly away from the door. On this, names of the masters of mosque were mentioned. This inscription with two lines, notes:"This is a work of Ustad Arif bin ustad Musa Jibal" 

On these inscriptions, the monument was called a mansion, not a mosque.

See also
Shakiragha mausoleum

References

15th-century mosques
Mausoleums in Azerbaijan
Tourist attractions in Baku
Monuments of Balakhani